The list of ships of Russia by project number includes all Russian and Soviet ships by assigned project numbers. Ship descriptions are Russian assigned classifications when known. The Russian term проект can be translated either as the cognate "project" or as "design".

 Project 1:  (Series I)
 Project 2:  (Series I & III)
 Project 3:  (Series I)
 Project 4:  (Series II)
 Project 5: Toplivo-1 class water lighter
 Project 6: 
 Project 7: 
 Project 7U: 
 Project 9: S-class diesel attack submarine
 Project 15: Modernization of 
 Project 19: NKVD large guard ship, cancelled 
 Project 20I:  leader
 Project 21: Study for 35,500-ton -style battleship
 Project 22: Heavy cruiser design cancelled 1939
 Project 23: 
 Project 23bis: Improvement over Project 23 with simplified belt armor of 380mm, American style TDS replacing Italian style, additional twin 100mm dual-purpose guns, 4 triple 152mm guns instead of 6 twin 152mm guns. 12 406mm gun variant was also made
 Project 24: post-World War II battleship design created to counter Iowa-class and Montana-class battleships
 Project 25: Study for 30,900-ton battleship
 Project 26:  light cruiser
 Project 26bis: Improved version of the Kirov-class
 Project 27: Proposal to reconstruct Petropavlovsk as a battlecruiser
 Project 28: Study for a 10,390-ton cruiser, precursor to 
 Project 29 
 Project 29K Yastreb-class guard ship (completed after World War II)
 Project 30: 
 Project 30K: Ognevoy-class destroyer (completed after World War II)
 Project 30bis: 
 Project 32: Conversion of Soobrazitelny-class destroyer Soobrazitelny to a salvage ship.
 Project 32A: Conversion of Soobrazitelny-class destroyer Stroyny to a salvage ship.
 Project 33: Conversion of Kirov-class cruiser  to a missile cruiser
 Project 34: Modernization of Skoryy-class destroyers
 Project 35: Destroyer design cancelled 1941
 Project 35:  large patrol ship
 Project 35M: Mirka II-class large patrol ship
 Project 38:  leader (Series II), also called Minsk-class
 Project 38bis: Modified Minsk-class destroyer leaders
 Project 39:  (Series IV)
 Project 40: Destroyer design cancelled 1944
 Project 41: K-class cruiser submarine
 Project 41: 
 Project 42:  large patrol ship
 Project 43: NKVD guard ship
 Project 45:  experimental destroyer
 Project 47: 4500-ton destroyer design
 Project 48:  leader 
 Project 48K: Post-war design of Kiev-class destroyer leader, cancelled 1950
 Project 50:  large patrol ship
 Project 52: Purga-class large guard ship
 Project 53:  (Series II)
 Project 53U:  (Series III)
 Project 56 Spokoinyy: 
 Project 56A: Modified Kotlin-class large anti-submarine ship
 Project 56EM:  (prototype)
 Project 56M: Kildin-class destroyer
 Project 56U: Modernised Kildin-class destroyer
 Project 57 Gnevny: Prototype  guided missile destroyer
 Project 57bis: Kanin-class guided missile destroyer
 Project 57AM/PLO: Kanin-class ASW destroyer
 Project 58:  (Series IV)
 Project 58:  missile cruiser
 Project 59: 
 Project 60: Coastal minesweeper design
 Project 61: 1939 design for a heavy gunboat
 Project 61: 
 Project 61M: Modified Kashin-class large anti-submarine ship
 Project 64: 48,000-ton battlecruiser armed with 356mm guns, improved Project 25 created in response to the Dunkerque-class and Scharnhorst-class battleships, precursor to Kronshtadt-class battlecruiser
 Project 66: heavy cruiser design armed with 220mm guns
 Project 67: Proposal to convert  light cruisers into missile cruisers
 Project 68:  light cruiser, all either cancelled or completed as Project 68K
 Project 68A: Sverdlov-class light cruiser with improved AA
 Project 68bis:  light cruiser
 Project 68bis-ZIF: Improved Sverdlov-class light cruiser
 Project 68E: Experimental missile cruiser conversion of Sverdlov-class light cruiser Admiral Nakhimov
 Project 68I: Design for Chapayev-class light cruiser armed with German guns
 Project 68K: Chapayev-class light cruiser (completed after World War II)
 Project 68S: Chapayev-class light cruiser Chkalov armed with German AA guns
 Project 68U1: Command ship conversion of Sverdlov-class light cruiser Zhdanov
 Project 68U2: Command ship conversion of Sverdlov-class light cruiser Admiral Senyavin
 Project 69: 
 Project 69I: Kronshtadt-class battlecruiser armed with German 30.5-cm guns
 Project 69AV: Proposal to convert unfinished hull of Kronshtadt battlecruiser into an aircraft carrier.
 Project 70E: Modification of  light cruiser Dzerzhinksy with SAM
 Project 71: Proposal to equip  light cruisers with SAMs
 Project 71A: Small aircraft carrier based on Chapayev-class light cruiser (cancelled 1940)
 Project 71B: Aircraft carrier based on Kronshtadt-class battlecruiser, total displacement of more than 30,000 tons. Air group of 70 aircraft (30 fighters, 40 torpedo bombers)
 Project 72: Study for a Aircraft carrier with a displacement of 28,880-tons and dimensions similar to the British Illustrious-class. 
 Project 78: Proposal to finish Svetlana-class cruiser Voroshilov (ex-Admiral Butakov) as training ship 
 Project 82: 
 Project 83: Ex-German heavy cruiser Lützow
 Project 94: 11,170-ton light cruiser design
 Project 95: Experimental attack submarine M-401
 Project 96: M-class submarine (Series XV)
 Project 96M: M-class submarine (Series XV, completed after World War II)
 Project 97: S-class submarine (Series XVI)
 Project 97: 
 Project 97AP/2: Improved Dobrynya-class icebreaker
 Project 97P:  icebreaker and border patrol ship
 Project 99: Design for a minelaying submarine based on the S-class submarine
 Project 103: SM-4 steel motor torpedo boat
 Project 106: 
 Project 116: G-5 type motor torpedo boat (Series XII and XIII)
 Project 122: Subchaser
 Project 122A:  subchaser, improved Project 122
 Project 122A: Medium floating dry dock
 Project 122bis:  subchaser, modification of Project 122A subchaser equipped with domestic engines
 Project 123 Komsomolets: Prototype motor torpedo boat, predecessor to P 4-class 
 Project 123bis Komsomolets:  motor torpedo boat
 Project 123K: Post-war variant of the P 4-class motor torpedo boat 
 Project 125: CODAG-powered hydrofoil torpedo boat 
 Project 125A: Border patrol boat variant of Project 125. 
 Project 130:  deperming vessel
 Project 133 Antares:  border patrol boat
 Project 133.1M: Parchim III-class small anti-submarine ship 
 Project 133.2: Parchim II-class small anti-submarine ship
 Project 138: Design for a 153-ton seagoing armoured gunboat, predecessor to Project 161 
 Project 141:  mooring buoy tender
 Project 145:  mooring/buoy tender
 Project 157: Experimental Series IX G-5 type MTB fitted with drop-collar torpedoes
 Project 157: Design of a steel-hulled D-3 type motor torpedo boat
 Project 159: 
 Project 160:  tanker
 Project 161: Seagoing armoured gunboat
 Project 163: STK DD experimental steel motor torpedo boat
 Project 165: 33-ton landing ship 
 Project 183 Bolshevik: 
 Project 183T: P-8-class torpedo boat
 Project 183TK: P-10-class torpedo boat
 Project 183R:  fast missile boat
 Project 184: Motor torpedo boat, unsuccessful, one modified with hydrofoil and jet engine 
 Project 186: Seagoing armoured gunboat, improved Project 161
 Project 190: Design for an armoured gunboat, cancelled 1949
 Project 191: Armoured gunboat
 Project 191M: Improved Project 191 armoured gunboat
 Project 192: Armoured gunboat, improved Project 191M
 Project 200: Motor torpedo boat and subchaser, improved D-3 type
 Project 201: SO1-class subchaser
 Project 201M: Improved SO1-class subchaser
 Project 201T: SO1-class subchaser with torpedoes
 Project 204:  anti-submarine corvette
 Project 205M Moskit:  fast missile boat
 Project 205M: Improved Osa-class fast missile boat
 Project 205P Tarantul:  border patrol boat
 Project 205T: Torpedo boat variant of the Osa-class
 Project 206 Shtorm: 
 Project 206E: Mol-class torpedo boat, export version of Shershen-class
 Project 206M: 
 Project 206MR Vikhr: 
 Project 213: G-5 type motor torpedo boats converted to gunboats with M-8 rocket launchers
 Project 234: UTK multipurpose boat
 Project 253L MT: MT class minesweeper 
 Project 254:  seagoing minesweeper
 Project 257:  coastal minesweeper
 Project 258:  radar picket conversion
 Project 258M: Upgrading of radars on Project 258 ships
 Project 264:  radar picket conversion
 Project 265:  minesweeper
 Project 266 Rubin:  seagoing minesweeper
 Project 266M Akvamarin: Natya-class seagoing minesweeper
 Project 266DB Akvamarin 2: Natya II-class seagoing minesweeper
 Project 291: Armoured gunboat design
 Project 300: Oskol I-class floating workshop
 Project 301T: Oskol II-class floating workshop
 Project 303: Modified Oskol-class floating workshop
 Project 304:  floating workshop
 Project 304M: Amur II class repair ship with passenger facilities
 Project 305:  electric power station
 Project 307: Self-propelled floating battery design 
 Project 310 Batur:  submarine support ship
 Project 311: 1100-ton monitor design 
 Project 323:  floating missile technician base
 Project 323B: Improved Lama class ballistic missile transport
 Project 357: Libau-class despatch vessel
 Project 376U: Yaroslavets class training launch
 Project 394B:  intelligence collection ship
 Project 411B: Dry cargo lighter
 Project 431: Cargo lighter
 Project 437N:  small tanker
 Project 503M:  small intelligence ship
 Project 513M: Modified T-43-class environmental monitoring ship
 Project 527M:  rescue ship
 Project 530 Karpaty: Nepa-class submarine salvage vessel 
 Project 536:  underwater research support ship
 Project 537:  rescue ship
 Project 550:  polar logistics ship
 Project 561:  water tanker
 Project 563:  seagoing tug
 Project 563S: Goryn-class rescue tug
 Project 577:  military tanker
 Project 593: Volgograd trials tender
 Project 611:  diesel-electric attack submarine
 Project 611AV :  diesel-electric attack submarine
 Project 613:  diesel-electric attack submarine
 Project 615:  coastal attack submarine
 Project 616:  Experimental high-test peroxide-powered submarine
 Project 627 Kit:  nuclear-powered attack submarine (prototype)
 Project 627A: November-class nuclear-powered attack submarine
 Project 628: Golf I-class diesel-electric strategic missile submarine
 Project 629M: Golf II-class diesel-electric strategic missile submarine
 Project 633:  diesel-electric attack submarine
 Project 636 Varshavyanka: Improved Kilo-class diesel-electric attack submarine
 Project 640: Whiskey Canvas Bag-class radar picket submarine
 Project 640T: Whiskey Canvas Bag-class communications submarine
 Project 640U: Whiskey Twin Cylinder class missile submarine (prototype)
 Project 641:  diesel-electric attack submarine
 Project 641B Som:  diesel-electric attack submarine
 Project 644: Whiskey Twin Cylinder-class missile submarine
 Project 645  nuclear-powered attack submarine with liquid metal reactor
 Project 651:  diesel-electric cruise missile submarine
 Project 655: Whiskey Long Bin-class diesel-electric cruise missile submarine
 Project 658: Hotel I-class nuclear-powered strategic missile submarine
 Project 658M: Hotel II-class nuclear-powered strategic missile submarine
 Project 659: Echo I-class nuclear-powered cruise missile submarine
 Project 659T: Echo I-class nuclear-powered attack submarine
 Project 661 Anchar:  nuclear-powered guided missile submarine
 Project 664: Projected nuclear-powered amphibious assault submarine-minelayer.
 Project 665:  diesel electric submarine
 Project 667A Navaga:  nuclear-powered ballistic missile submarine
 Project 667AM Navaga-M: Yankee II-class ballistic missile submarine
 Project 667AU Nalim: Yankee I & II class missile upgrade
 Project 667AT Grusha: Yankee Notch-class attack submarine conversion
 Project 667M Andromeda: Yankee Sidecar-class cruise missile submarine conversion
 Project 667B Murena: Delta I-class nuclear-powered strategic missile submarine
 Project 667BD Murena-M: Delta II-class nuclear-powered strategic missile submarine
 Project 667BDR Kalmar: Delta III-class nuclear-powered strategic missile submarine
 Project 667BDRM Delfin: Delta IV-class nuclear-powered strategic missile submarine
 Project 670A Skat: Charlie I-class nuclear-powered cruise missile submarine
 Project 670M Chayka: Charlie II-class nuclear-powered cruise missile submarine
 Project 671 Yersh: Victor I-class nuclear-powered attack submarine
 Project 671RT Semga : Victor II-class nuclear-powered attack submarine
 Project 671RTM Shchuka: Victor III-class nuclear-powered attack submarine
 Project 675: Echo II-class nuclear-powered cruise missile submarine
 Project 677: Lada:  diesel-electric attack submarine
 Project 685: Plavnik:  nuclear-powered attack submarine
 Project 690: Kefal:  diesel-electric submarine
 Project 699: Upgraded 
 Project 701: Hotel III-class nuclear-powered strategic missile submarine
 Project 705 Lira:  nuclear-powered attack submarine
 Project 712:  rescue tug
 Project 717: Projected nuclear-powered amphibious assault submarine (1970)
 Project 730:  seagoing tug
 Project 733:  seagoing tug
 Project 733S:  Rescue tug developed from Okhtenskiy class seagoing tug, hence S suffix added to the project number (S = Spastel'niy) 
 Project 740:  freighter
 Project 745:  seagoing tug
 Project 748: Projected nuclear-powered amphibious assault submarine
 Project 770: Polnocny A-class small landing ship
 Project 771: Polnocny B-class small landing ship
 Project 772U: Bryza class training cutter
 Project 773: Polnocny C-class medium landing ship
 Project 773U: Polnocny D-class medium landing ship
 Project 775: Ropucha I-class large landing ship
 Project 775M: Ropucha II-class large landing ship
 Project 776: Modified Polnocny C-class amphibious assault command ship
 Project 782: medium floating dry dock
 Project 823: medium floating dry dock
 Project 850:  expeditionary oceanographic vessel
 Project 860 Azimut:  hydrographic survey ship
 Project 861:  hydrographic survey ship
 Project 861M: Moma-class small intelligence ship
 Project 862:  expeditionary oceanographic vessel
 Project 862.1: Yug-class medium intelligence ship
 Project 862.2: Improved Yug-class intelligence ship
 Project 864:  large intelligence ship
 Project 865 Pyranja:  midget submarine
 Project 870:  hydrographic survey ship
 Project 871:  hydrographic survey ship
 Project 872:  munition ship
 Project 873:  expeditionary oceanographic vessel
 Project 877 Paltus:  diesel-electric attack submarine
 Project 885 Yasen:  nuclear-powered attack submarine
 Project 887: 
 Project 935:  nuclear-powered ballistic missile submarine (prototype)
 Project 940 Lenok:  diesel-electric rescue submarine
 Project 941 Akula:  nuclear-powered strategic missile submarine
 Project 945A Barrakuda: Sierra I-class nuclear-powered attack submarine
 Project 945B Kondor: Sierra II-class nuclear-powered attack submarine
 Project 949 Granit: Oscar I-class nuclear-powered cruise missile submarine
 Project 949A Antei: Oscar II-class nuclear-powered cruise missile submarine
 Project 955:  nuclear-powered ballistic missile submarine
 Project 955A: Borei II-class nuclear-powered ballistic missile submarine
 Project 956 Sarych: 
 Project 956A Sarych: Improved Sovremenny-class destroyer
 Project 959 Oko: proposed further T58-class minesweeper radar picket conversion with improved radar
 Project 962: proposed radar picket ship based on the Kara-class cruiser
 Project 971 Bars:  nuclear-powered attack submarine
 Project 971U Shchuka B: Akula II-class nuclear-powered attack submarine
 Project 977.0 Akson: Yankee Pod-class nuclear-powered submarine sonar testbed conversion
 Project 978.0: Yankee Stretch-class nuclear-powered small submarine support submarine
 Project 996: proposed Sovremennyy-class destroyer radar picket conversion
 Project 1041.0:  fast patrol boat
 Project 1041.1: Svetlyak-class Kh-35 missile boat 
 Project 1041.2: export version of Svetlyak
 Project 1075: Lida-class minesweeper
 Project 1080: Missile cruiser
 Project 1083.1:  special purpose submarine
 Project 1112: 
 Project 1123 Kondor:  anti-submarine cruiser
 Project 1124: Armoured river gunboat
 Project 1124K Albatros: Grisha IV-class small anti-submarine ship
 Project 1124M Albatros: Grisha III-class small anti-submarine ship
 Project 1124P Albatros: Grisha II-class small anti-submarine ship
 Project 1124.4 Albatros: Grisha V-class small anti-submarine ship
 Project 1125: Armoured river gunboat, smaller Project 1124
 Project 1134 Berkut:  missile cruiser
 Project 1134A Berkut-A:  anti-submarine cruiser
 Project 1134B Berkut-B:  anti-submarine cruiser
 Project 1135 Burevestnik: Krivak I / Bditel'nyy-class large patrol ship
 Project 1135M Burevestnik-M: Krivak II / Bessmennyy-class large patrol ship
 Project 1135.1 Nerey: Krivak III / Menzhinskiy-class border patrol ship
 Project 1135.2 Burevestnik: Krivak IV / Legkiy-class large patrol ship
 Project 1135.5 Nerey: Krivak III-class border patrol ship
 Project 1135.6 Grigorovich: Admiral Grigorovich-class large patrol ship
 Project 1141.1 Sokol: Aleksandr Kunakhovich small anti-submarine ship
 Project 1143.0 Krechet:  aircraft-carrying battlecruiser
 Project 1143.0E: Lamantin-class projected nuclear-powered heavy aircraft carrier
 Project 1143.5:  fixed-wing aircraft carrier
 Project 1143.7:  projected nuclear-powered aircraft carrier (1984)
 Project 1144.2 Orlan:  nuclear-powered missile battlecruiser
 Project 1145.1 Sokol: Mukha small anti-submarine ship
 Project 1151.0: 
 Project 1153 Orel: Project OREL projected nuclear-powered aircraft carrier (1975)
 Project 1154.0 Yastreb: 
 Project 1155 Fregat:  anti-submarine destroyer
 Project 1155.1 Fregat: Udaloy II / Admiral Chabanenko, 
 Project 1157.0: 
 Project 1159: 
 Project 1160 Oryol: Projected nuclear-powered aircraft carrier (1969)
 Project 1164 Atlant:  missile cruiser
 Project 1166.1:  small anti-submarine ship
 Project 1171 Tapir:  large landing ship
 Project 1171.1: 
 Project 1171.1E: Cayman-class amphibious assault ship
 Project 1172: 
 Project 1174:  large landing ship
 Project 1175: 
 Project 1176 Akula: 
 Project 1177.0 Serna: 
 Project 1178: Kherson proposed Kiev-type amphibious assault ship
 Project 1190:  seagoing monitor
 Project 1204:  river monitor
 Project 1205 Skat:  landing craft (hovercraft)
 Project 1206 Kalmar:  landing craft (hovercraft)
 Project 1206.1 Murena:  landing craft (hovercraft)
 Project 1206.1E: export version Type 1206.1 without artillery rocket launchers.
 Project 1206T: Pelikan class minelayer, mine laying version of Project 1206
 Project 1208 Slepen''':  river patrol boat
 Project 1209 Omar:  landing craft (hovercraft)
 Project 12210: fuel lighter
 Project 1232.1 Dzheyran:  small landing ship (hovercraft)
 Project 1232.2 Zubr: Zubr-class small landing ship (hovercraft)
 Project 1234 Ovod: Nanuchka I-class small missile ship
 Project 1234.1: Nanuchka III / Burun-class small missile ship
 Project 1234.2: Nanuchka IV / Nakat-class small missile ship
 Project 1236:  Torpedo trials ship
 Project 1238 Kasatka: Kasatka-class air cushion gunboat, based on Lebed-class LCAC
 Project 1239 Sivuch: Dergach / Bora class small missile ship
 Project 1240 Uragan:  fast missile boat
 Project 1241 Molniya: Tarantul I-class missile boat
 Project 1241PE: Modified Pauk-class border patrol ship
 Project 1241.1RZ Molniya M: Tarantul III-class missile boat
 Project 1241.2 Molniya: Tarantul II-class missile boat
 Project 1241.2 Molniya 2: Pauk-class small anti-submarine ship
 Project 1241.2P Molniya 2: Pauk I-class border patrol ship
 Project 1248 Moskit:  river patrol boat
 Project 1248.1: Vosh class riverine patrol boat without mine laying rails.
 Project 1249:  border patrol ship
 Project 1258:  harbor minesweeper
 Project 1259 Malakhit:  
 Project 1265 Yakhont:  base minesweeper
 Project 1266.0:  seagoing minesweeper
 Project 1270.0: 
 Project 1274: Improved Klasz'ma class cable layer with mine laying capability
 Project 1330: fisheries protection boat
 Project 1350: Raduzhnyy-class refrigerated fish carrier
 Project 13560: medium floating dry dock
 Project 1360: Chika class presidential yacht
 Project 1388M: Razvedchik class flag officer's yacht
 Project 1415.1: Tanya class workboat
 Project 1431.0:  border patrol boat
 Project 1452:  rescue tug
 Project 1453: Ingul-class rescue tug
 Project 1454: Sorum Mod-class experimental craft
 Project 14670: officers' yacht
 Project 1481:  Riverine fuel lighter
 Project 15010: fuel lighter
 Project 1541:  missile fuel tanker
 Project 1545:  water tanker
 Project 1549:  water tanker
 Project 1559B:  military tanker
 Project 1593:  military tanker
 Project 1595:  freighter
 Project 16570:  salvage tug
 Project 16900A:  cargo lighter
 Project 1710 Makrel: Beluga-class experimental submarine
 Project 1760: Medium floating dry dock
 Project 1780: Shilka class medium floating dry dock
 Project 1783A:  special wastes tanker
 Project 1791: 
 Project 1799:  deperming vessel
 Project 1799A: Improved Pelym class deperming vessel
 Project 1806:  hydroacoustic monitoring ship and physical fields measuring vessel
 Project 1823:  military transport
 Project 1824: Muna-class military transport
 Project 1826: Lira / Balzam-class large intelligence ship
 Project 1828:  large intelligence ship
 Project 1840: Lima-class experimental submarine
 Project 1851: Paltus (Nelma) class special op submarine
 Project 1859: Berezina replenishment ship. Holm lists as Project 1833. Single vessel, Berezina, operated in the Black Sea Fleet from 1978 (acceptance into fleet service) to 2002. Scrapped in Turkey in late 2002.
 Project 1886: 
 Project 1893: Katun I-class firefighting ship
 Project 1908: Akademik Sergei Korolev telemetry tracking and control ship
 Project 1909: Kosmonavt Yuri Gagarin telemetry tracking and control ship
 Project 1910 Kashalot:  special purpose submarine
 Project 1914.1:  range instrumentation ship
 Project 1917: Kosmonaut Vladimir Komarov telemetry tracking and control ship 
 Project 1918: 
 Project 1941 Titan: 
 Project 1993: Katun II-class firefighting ship, also known as Ikar class
 Project 2012.0 Sargan: 
 Project 2020:  nuclear fuel transport ship 
 Project 2038.0:  
 Project 2038.2: Tigr, export version of Steregushchy Project 2038.5: , modernized Steregushchy Project 2038.6:  corvette
 Project 2091.0:  air cushioned vehicle
 Project 2127.0: flag officer's yacht
 Project 2163.0: 
 Project 2163.1: Buyan-M, modernized Buyan Project 2163.2: Tornado, export version of Buyan Project 2182.0: 
 Project 2190.0: LK-16 icebreaker
 Project 2195.6:  projected missile destroyer (2007)
 Project 2198.0: 
 Project 2212.0: 
 Project 2216.0: Project 22160 large patrol ship
 Project 2235.0: 
 Project 2246.0: 
 Project 2280.0: 
 Project 2300.0 Shtorm: Project 23000E projected nuclear-powered aircraft carrier (2013)
 Project 2313.0: Akademik Pashin-class military tanker
 Project 2356.0:  destroyer
 Project 2390.0 Ivan Rogov: Project 23900 projected amphibious assault ship
 Project A-202:  seagoing tug
 Project B-92: 
 Project B-93:  geophysical research ship
 Project B-99: Iva / Vikhr-class rescue tug
 Project B-320/320 II: 
 Project SB-12: Udarnyy-class river monitor
 Project SB-15: Usyskin-class paddle steam tug converted to gunboats
 Project SB-16: 400hp paddle steam tug
 Project SB-30: Aktivny-class river monitor
 Project SB-37: Zheleznyakov''-class river monitor
 Project SB-47: 400hp paddle steam tug, welded version of Project SB-16
 Project SB-48: 400hp paddle steam tug
 Project SB-48a: 400hp paddle steam tug
 Project SB-51: 400hp paddle steam tug
 Project SB-57: Shilka-class river monitor, all scuttled 1941

See also 
U.S. Navy SCB projects list

References

Bibliography

External links
 

Project
Ships

de:Boote der sowjetischen und russischen Marine